PJW hash function is a non-cryptographic hash function created by Peter J. Weinberger of AT&T Bell Labs.

Other versions
A variant of PJW hash had been used to create ElfHash or Elf64 hash that is used in Unix object files with ELF format.

Allen Holub has created a portable version of PJW hash algorithm that had a bug and ended up in several textbooks, as the author of one of these textbooks later admitted.

Algorithm
PJW hash algorithm involves shifting the previous hash and adding the current byte followed by moving the high bits:

 algorithm PJW_hash(s) is
     uint h := 0
     bits := uint size in bits
     for i := 1 to |S| do
         h := h << bits/8 + s[i]
         high := get top bits/8 bits of h from left
         if high ≠ 0 then
             h := h xor (high >> bits * 3/4)
             h := h & ~high
     return h

Implementation
Below is the algorithm implementation used in Unix ELF format:

unsigned long ElfHash(const unsigned char *s)
{
    unsigned long   h = 0, high;
    while (*s)
    {
        h = (h << 4) + *s++;
        if (high = h & 0xF0000000)
            h ^= high >> 24;
        h &= ~high;
    }
    return h;
}

See also 
Non-cryptographic hash functions

References

Articles with example pseudocode
Articles with example C code
Hash function (non-cryptographic)